Phomopsis javanica is a plant pathogen that causes Phomopsis blight in asparagus.

References

External links
 Index Fungorum
USDA ARS Fungal Database

Fungal plant pathogens and diseases
Vegetable diseases
javanica